Minuscule 229 (in the Gregory-Aland numbering), ε 1206 (Soden), is a Greek minuscule manuscript of the New Testament, on parchment. It is dated by a colophon to 1140.

Description 

The codex contains the text of the four Gospels with two lacunae (Mark 16:16-20; John 1:1-11), on 297 parchment leaves (size ). The leaves are arranged in octavo (eight leaves in quire). The text is written in one column per page, 21 lines per page.

It contains pictures and subscriptions at the end of each Gospel. 
Many corrections were made in the 14th century.

Kurt Aland the Greek text of the codex did not place in any Category.
According to the Claremont Profile Method it represents textual family Πa in Luke 1. In Luke 10 and Luke 20 it represents family Kx.

History 

According to the colophon it was: Ετελειωθη το παρων βιβλιον δια χειρος βασιλειου νοταριου του Αργυροπουλου μηνι ιαννουαριω εις α. Νυ του ςχμ ετους.

The manuscript was written by Basilius, a notary from Argyropolis, in 1140. In the 14th century someone corrected text of the codex in many places. 

It was described by Daniel Gotthilf Moldenhawer, who collated it about 1783 for Andreas Birch (Esc. 8). Emmanuel Miller described it very briefly in 1848.

It is currently housed at the Escurial (Cod. Escurialensis, X. IV. 21).

See also 

 List of New Testament minuscules
 Biblical manuscript
 Textual criticism

References

Further reading 

 Emmanuel Miller, Catalogue des manuscrits grecs de la bibliothèque de l'Escurial (Paris 1848), p. 407.

External links 
 Minuscule 229 at the Encyclopedia of Textual Criticism

Greek New Testament minuscules
12th-century biblical manuscripts